Langwasser Nord station is a Nuremberg U-Bahn station, located on the U1 line.

References

Nuremberg U-Bahn stations
Railway stations in Germany opened in 1972
1972 establishments in West Germany